A Wider Bridge is a United States based 501(c)(3) nonprofit organization which has a goal of connecting LGBT communities in the U.S. and Israel and advocating for LGBT rights in Israel. Their tagline is "Equality in Israel and Equality for Israel.” The organization currently has offices in San Francisco, Washington, D.C., Chicago, New York, and Tel Aviv.

History 
The organization was founded in 2010 by Arthur Slepian after a homophobic shooting in Bar Noar, a gay bar in Tel Aviv. Slepian thought that LGBT relations between North America and Israel should not only come in times of crisis, but that the communities in both countries should be more consistently connected. The group also focuses on the message that it is possible to be both LGBT and Jewish.

In 2011 A Wider Bridge was named an Upstarter by the group UpStart, a Jewish entrepreneurial group.

In 2017 A Wider Bridge announced that they would be changing directors on January 15 of 2018 from Arthur Slepian to Tye Gregory.

In July 2020 A Wider Bridge announced Ethan Felson as executive director.

Services

Education 
A Wider Bridge does educational presentations at various places across the United States, including college campuses, to inform others about LGBT rights in Israel. The group brings LGBT activists and artists from Israel across the U.S. to help educate people about LGBT life and culture in Israel. A Wider Bridge also educates Jewish LGBT individuals in how to be better leaders.

Trips to Israel 
A Wider Bridge plans and sponsors trips that take LGBT people from the United States to various places in Israel so that they can learn and connect with LGBT and other human rights organizations in Israel and develop their leadership skills. The groups also meet with LGBT Palestinians and Ethiopians.

A Wider Bridge has also partnered with Olivia Travel to sponsor a trip specifically for women focusing on feminist and lesbian issues in Israel.

Refugee advocacy 
A Wider Bridge hosts events specifically to educate the public on issues about LGBT refugees from the Middle East and North Africa. The group also works to raise money for organizations helping these same LGBT refugees.

Controversy

Creating Change Conference 
In 2016, A Wider Bridge had planned to present with Jerusalem Open House, an Israeli-based LGBT organization, at the National LGBTQ Task Force's Creating Change Conference. The presentation was cancelled by the National LGBTQ Task Force because of an outcry from anti-Israel activists. A Wider Bridge called for the presentation to be uncancelled through a petition and press release. The presentation was then uncancelled. The presentation did go on, but was interrupted by protestors and was not completed. The National LGBTQ Task Force later condemned the protest for anti-semitism.

Chicago Dyke March 
At the 2017 Chicago Dyke March, three women were expelled for carrying a rainbow flag with the Star of David on it, a symbol of representation for Jewish LGBT individuals. The march organizers claimed that the women were kicked out because the march was anti-Zionist and pro-Palestine and because others were feeling threatened. One of the women who was expelled was a regional director at A Wider Bridge, and the organization has since come out against their expulsion and has created a petition asking the organizers of the Chicago Dyke March to apologize. The Anti-Defamation League, Human Rights Campaign, and the Simon Wiesenthal Center, have also spoken out against the banning of the Jewish Pride flag and the expulsion of the women.

References

External links 
 A Wider Bridge's Website

LGBT organizations in the United States
Organizations based in San Francisco
Organizations established in 2010
LGBT culture in San Francisco
A wider bridge
LGBT in Israel
2010 establishments in the United States